Starwort is a common name for several plants and may refer to:

Aster
Spergula arvensis
Stellaria

See also
Water starwort